Spiculimermis is a genus of nematodes belonging to the family Mermithidae.

Species:
 Spiculimermis acaudata Rubzov, 1976 
 Spiculimermis angusta Rubzov, 1972

References

Mermithidae
Enoplea genera